Serine/threonine-protein kinase Nek2 is an enzyme that in humans is encoded by the NEK2 gene.

Interactions 

NEK2 has been shown to interact with MAPK1 and NDC80.
Protein kinase which is involved in the control of centrosome separation and bipolar spindle formation in mitotic cells and chromatin condensation in meiotic cells. Regulates centrosome separation (essential for the formation of bipolar spindles and high-fidelity chromosome separation) by phosphorylating centrosomal proteins such as CROCC, CEP250 and NINL, resulting in their displacement from the centrosomes. Regulates kinetochore microtubule attachment stability in mitosis via phosphorylation of NDC80. Involved in regulation of mitotic checkpoint protein complex via phosphorylation of CDC20 and MAD2L1. Plays an active role in chromatin condensation during the first meiotic division through phosphorylation of HMGA2. Phosphorylates: PPP1CC; SGOL1; NECAB3 and NPM1. Essential for localization of MAD2L1 to kinetochore and MAPK1 and NPM1 to the centrosome. Isoform 1 phosphorylates and activates NEK11 in G1/S-arrested cells. Isoform 2, which is not present in the nucleolus, does not [Uniprot].

References

Further reading 

 
 
 
 
 
 
 
 
 
 
 
 
 
 
 
 
 
 

Human proteins